Andreas Weinmair (died 1491) was a Roman Catholic prelate who served as Auxiliary Bishop of Passau (1477–1491).

Biography
In 1477, Andreas Weinmair was appointed during the papacy of Pope Sixtus IV as Auxiliary Bishop of Passau and Titular Bishop of Constantia in Arabia. On 28 Sep 1477, he was consecrated bishop. He served as Auxiliary Bishop of Passau until his death in 1491.

References 

15th-century Roman Catholic bishops in Bavaria
Bishops appointed by Pope Sixtus IV
1491 deaths